Tillegem Castle is a castle in Belgium.
Since 1980, the castle and its park have been property of the Province of West Flanders.

See also
List of castles in Belgium

References

Castles in Belgium